Alcoholic Beverage Control is a division of the Idaho State Police responsible for the control of alcoholic beverages in the state. The Idaho State Liquor Dispensary maintains a monopoly on the sale of all alcoholic beverages that exceed 16% alcohol by volume. The ABC enforces Title 23 - Alcoholic Beverages IDAPA 11 Title 05 Chapter 01.

IABC is based in Meridian, Idaho.

External links
 IABC

State alcohol agencies of the United States
State law enforcement agencies of Idaho
Alcohol monopolies